Alistair John Rowan an Irish architectural historian, professor and author of British, Irish and European architectural history.
 
Rowan, born in Belast on 3 June 1938, is the second son of Francis Peter Rowan, manager of Blackstaff Linen Spinning Mill, Belfast and his wife Margaret Gemmil Scoular, whose family came from Kilmmarnock in Scotland. Rowan was educated at Campbell College, Belfast, 1951 - 1956; he took the Diploma in Architecture at the Edinburgh College of Art, 1956 - 1961, followed by a Ph.D. in the School of Architecture at the University of Cambridge, 1961 - 1964. The supervisor of his doctoral research was Sir Howard Colvin, Librarian of St. John's College, Oxford. Following the completion of his doctorate Rowan won an Italian government scholarship for two years, to work in art history at the University of Padua, 1965 - 1966. In Italy he profited greatly from the friendship and support of Count Novello Papafava dei Carraresi, and his family, in whose archive he worked.  

In November 1966 Rowan was appointed an assistant architectural editor for Country Life (magazine)working with John Cornforth to produce the 'anchor' articles on British Country houses which, at that time, were seen as an essential feature of the magazine.Country Life. When, at the end of October 1967, he joined the staff of the University of Edinburgh, giving up full-time journalism, the editor of Country Life - John Adams - offered him a retaining contract, to write solely for the magazine as its Scottish correspondent. Under this arrangement he was to contribute over fifty major articles, on country houses in England, Scotland and Ireland, before his connection with the magazine came to an end. By that time Rowan had spent ten years working in Edinburgh University as Lecturer in the Department of Fine Art, first under Professor David Talbot Rice and then under Professor Giles Robertson. In September 1977 he was appointed the first professor and Head of the Department in the History of Art in University College, Dublin (U.C.D.). After thirteen years in Ireland, Rowan returned to Scotland in November 1980 as Principal and CEO of Edinburgh College of Art a position which he held until December 2000 He was Slade Professor of Fine Art at the University of Oxford for 1988–89, when his lectures were devoted to the architecture and careers of the brothers, Robert and James Adam. In 2001 he was invited to move to University College Cork, as first professor of the History of Art, tasked with establishing art-historical studies within the undergraduate programmes of the College. He retired from active teaching in September 2003. when he  was over 65 years of age. Departmentweb|url=http://www.hoa.ox.ac.uk/fileadmin/hoa/documents/pdf/Oxford_Slade_Professors.pdf |title=Oxford Slade Professors, 1870–present |publisher=University of Oxford |date=2012 |accessdate=27 January 2015 |format=PDF |url-status=dead |archiveurl=https://web.archive.org/web/20150213123228/http://www.hoa.ox.ac.uk/fileadmin/hoa/documents/pdf/Oxford_Slade_Professors.pdf |archivedate=13 February 2015}}</ref>

Photographs contributed by Rowan to the Conway Library are currently being digitised by the Courtauld Institute of Art, as part of the Courtauld Connects project.ua

Memberships
Rowan has served on the Council of the National Trust for Scotland, on the Historic Buildings Council for Scotland and has been President of the Society of Architectural Historians of Great Britain and of the Architectural Heritage Society of Scotland.

Published books
Alistair Rowan. North West Ulster: Londonderry, Donegal, Fermanagh, and Tyrone. Buildings of Ireland Series. Dublin: Penguin Books, 1979.
Christine Casey and Alistair John Rowan. North Leinster: the Counties of Longford, Louth, Meath and Westmeath. Buildings of Ireland Series. London: Penguin Books, 1993.

References

Year of birth missing (living people)
British architectural historians
Irish architectural historians
Academics of University College Cork
Academics of the University of Edinburgh
Edinburgh College of Art
Academics of University College Dublin
Living people
Slade Professors of Fine Art (University of Oxford)
Country Life (magazine) people